Maa Pallelo Gopaludu is a 1985 Telugu-language film directed by Kodi Ramakrishna. The film starred Arjun and Poornima. The film was commercially successful and ran for 367 days.  This film marked the Telugu debut of Arjun. Arjun and Kodi Ramakrishna later collaborated for four other films.

Cast
 Arjun as Gopalam
 Poornima
 Raja
 Gollapudi
 Chandrika
 Vijaya
 Kalpana Rai
 P. J. Sharma
 Chidatala Apparao
 Baby Saraswathi
 Varalakshmi
 Ali (child artist)

Soundtrack 
Soundtrack was composed by K. V. Mahadevan.
"Rani Ranamma" - S. P. Balasubrahmanyam, P. Susheela
"Sariga Sariga" - S. P. Balasubrahmanyam
"Ko Ko Kothi" - S. P. Balasubrahmanyam
"Nenu Ele" - S. P. Balasubrahmanyam
"Kum Kummanthine" - S. P. Balasubrahmanyam

References

External links
 

Films directed by Kodi Ramakrishna
Films scored by K. V. Mahadevan
1980s Telugu-language films
Indian drama films